Texas Gun Fighter is a 1932 American Western film directed by Phil Rosen and starring Ken Maynard. It was produced and distributed by the soon to be defunct Tiffany Pictures.

A print of the film is preserved in the Library of Congress.

Cast
Ken Maynard - Bill Dane
Sheila Mannors - Jane Adams
Harry Woods - Mason
Lloyd Ingraham - Banty
James "Jim" Mason - Drag Kells
Bob Fleming - Clayton
 Edgar Lewis - Frank Adams
Frank Hall Crane

References

External links
 

1932 films
Films directed by Phil Rosen
1932 Western (genre) films
American Western (genre) films
American black-and-white films
Tiffany Pictures films
1930s American films